Eco-Médias is a Moroccan media company partially owned by several businesspeople. It publishes newspapers that are widely distributed in the country and whose editorial line is pro-government.

Subsidiaries
Assabah (Arabic-language daily, printed 86,907 copies/day in 2012)
L'Économiste (French-language economic news daily, printed 24,053 copies/day in 2012) 
 L'Economiste (French-language monthly business magazine)
Atlantic radio, (French-language music and business news radio)
Ecole Supérieur de Journalisme et de Communication, the leading journalism school in Morocco
Eco-print, company that prints their publications

Key people
Abdelmounaim Dilami, President and Director General
Khalid Belyazid, Director General
Marie-Thérèse Bourrut (French citizen and wife of Abdelmounaim Dilami. She writes under the pen-name Nadia Salah), Director of publication

Ownership
As of 2009:
Marie-Thérèse BOURRUT 31.3%
Abdelmounaïm DILAMI 29.2%
Khalid BELYAZID 3.5%
AIXOR (holding company owned by Jean Luc Martinet, the national delegate for the right-wing French party UMP) 10.3%
SUNERGIA (Nader MAWLAWI, Lebanese businessman) 10.3%
GLOBAL COMMUNICATION (subsidiary of SNI 10.3%
SOPAR (Kettani family) 7.5%

After the death of Hassan II the couple Bourrut-Dilami increased their share in the company, controlling today the majority stake. Additionally the company saw the entrance of French national Martinet in the capital despite a ban on foreign ownership in the media in the Moroccan law. In 1996 the ownership was:
Marie-Thérèse BOURRUT (aka Nadia Salah) 15%
Abdelmounaïm DILAMI 9.5%
Khalid BELYAZID 3.5%
Nassredine EL AFRIT (Tunisian national)  7.5%
Moulay Abdelhafid EL ALAMY (president of the Holding Saham and Minister of Industry since 2013) 9.5%
Abderrahmane SAAÏDI (Minister of privatisation at the time) 9.1%
Global Communication 9.5%
Sopar 7.5%.
Afriquia (subsidiary of Aziz Akhannouch's Akwa) 5%
Kat (OUAZZANI family and Kamil Ouazzani, importer of Alcoholic beverages and liqueur) 9.5%
Sunergia 9.5%
Attijari Capital Risque (subsidiary of Banque Commerciale du Maroc which merged with Wafa to form Attijariwafa bank in 2003)  7.5%

References

External links
Ecomedias.ma

1991 establishments in Morocco
Mass media companies established in 1991
Mass media companies of Morocco
Mass media in Casablanca
ONA Group
Société Nationale d'Investissement